The Sentul Komuter station is a Malaysian commuter train station formerly known as Sentul railway station and is located in the east side of and named after Sentul, Kuala Lumpur. Since 2015, the station has been on the Seremban Line of the KTM Komuter train services. For a long time, this station served as the northern terminus of the Sentul-Port Klang route until the line was extended to Batu Caves, when the station continued to be on the Batu Caves-Port Klang Line until the route change in December 2015 to accommodate the Klang Valley Double Tracking upgrade.

The station is located at the end of Jalan Perhentian, off Jalan Ipoh.

The station is situated a distance away from two elevated Ampang and Sri Petaling Lines stations which share similar names as the town of Sentul and the Komuter station, and serve the same locality. The Sentul Komuter station is located 730 m southwest from the Sentul Timur LRT station, and 900 m northwest from the Sentul LRT station, which is located in the southern area of Sentul.

Design 

The Sentul station as a building has existed since Sentul was used as a central workshop and depot for Federated Malay States Railway trains, but was not demolished and replaced during the 1989-1995 Klang Valley electrification and double-tracking project. Rather, the building was retained and retrofitted to support access to KTM Komuter services, with the addition of faregates and the upgrading of the ticket office. The station is also one of a few remaining stations designated in the Komuter system to be constructed of wood. Although located along more than three railway tracks and located beside a major depot, the station is fashioned as a modestly sized station, with room for only a waiting area and two-room office space. The station was, nevertheless, in charge of managing railway switches and supports a small railway staff.

The station retains a gap between the building and the line, suggesting a side platform that was removed during the electrification project, in place of a single island platform, between two railway tracks, laid 70 m southwest from the station. The main building is linked to the platform via a long sheltered walkway and an overhead pedestrian bridge. The pedestrian bridge is also connected to a train depot, but is locked from the public.

Depots 
The Sentul station is linked to two major train depots. One is an older and larger variation, known as the Sentul Works, serving KTM in general, east from the Komuter station. The Sentul Works has been operational since 1905, before Peninsular Malaysia's independence, consisting of numerous brick buildings and metal sheds primarily used as a workshop and storage area for steam and diesel locomotives and railway cars. Occupying an estimated 5.2 hectares (13 acres) of land, the Sentul Works is the largest train depot in Malaysia, but has been deemed dilapidated after decades of use, and the majority of connecting railway lines to the north and west dismantled and replaced by parkland for Sentul Park. A central workshop to be constructed in Batu Gajah is slated to replace the Sentul Works by August 2009, where the land it is situated on is earmarked for property development by YTL Land & Development, as part of the Sentul East and Sentul West master plan. The depot's westernmost brick train shed was remodelled for use as the Kuala Lumpur Performing Arts Centre, and opened in 2005.

A second, more recent train depot, further north from the Sentul station, is primarily designated for KTM Komuter EMUs, where the storage and maintenance of a majority of the Komuter service's rolling stock take place. The depot consists of two metal framed structures covered with metal sheets located along what was a portion of the main railway lines, connected to (as of 2007) the sparsely used Sentul-Batu Caves single track line. A single railway line running around the EMU depot acts as a direct link between the Sentul station to the Sentul-Batu Caves line.

Replacement 

In comparison to most older but smaller train stations along the Komuter Lines, the replacement of the Sentul station is planned to take place much later after Komuter services began operation in 1995. During the early 2000s, YTL Land & Development had vested interest in developing the area surrounding the Sentul station, its master plan to include a newer and more integrated station in place of its older counterpart. The project has faced several years of delays, and the old station was allowed to continue operation.

It was later announced that the station would form part of a long-postpone double-tracking, modernisation and electrification of the Sentul-Batu Caves line, as well as the resumption of YTL's development project. Site possession was given to contractor YTL on 17 November 2006 and the project was scheduled to be completed in May 2009. The rebuilt Sentul station opened in 2010 as the first completion of the project.

References

External links 

Sentul KTM Komuter Station

Railway stations in Kuala Lumpur
Seremban Line